The Tower Commission was a United States presidential commission established on December 1, 1986, by President Ronald Reagan in response to the Iran–Contra affair (in which senior administration officials secretly facilitated the sale of arms to Iran, which was the subject of an arms embargo). The commission, composed of former Senator John Tower of Texas, former Secretary of State Edmund Muskie, and former National Security Advisor Brent Scowcroft, was tasked with reviewing the proper role of the National Security Council staff in national security operations generally, and in the arms transfers to Iran specifically.

The Commission's report, published on February 27, 1987, concluded that CIA Director William Casey, who supported the Iran-Contra arrangement, should have taken over the operation and made the president aware of the risks and notified Congress as legally required. The Commission's work was continued by two congressional investigative committees (both formed in January 1987). Shortly after forming the Tower Commission, President Reagan also named Lawrence Walsh as the independent counsel in charge of the Iran-Contra criminal investigation.

Process
The Commission report described its purpose in the following way:

Because of its limited mandate, the Commission had no powers to subpoena documents, compel testimony, or grant immunity from prosecution. Over the course of several weeks, the Commission took testimony from 86 witnesses, and was able to retrieve backup copies from an NSC mainframe of some files which NSC staff had sought to delete. There was some debate about whether to publish the Commission's detailed chronology of events, but with the removal of some details of sourcing, methods and names of contacts, it was ultimately published as an annex to the Commission's report.

Report

Issued on February 26, 1987, the commission's report "held Reagan accountable for a lax managerial style and aloofness from policy detail."

Oliver North, John Poindexter, Caspar Weinberger, and others were also implicated.

Summarised, the main findings showed that "Using the Contras as a front, and against international law, and US law, weapons were sold, using Israel as intermediaries, to Iran, during the brutal Iran–Iraq War. The US was also supplying weapons to Iraq, including ingredients for nerve gas, mustard gas and other chemical weapons."

Appendix B of the report opens with the line attributed to Juvenal, "Quis custodiet ipsos custodes?".

Responses
President Ronald Reagan issued a primetime address on March 4, 1987, addressing the report's conclusions. Some individuals named in the report complained about how they were portrayed.

References

Further reading
 Chapter 5, "The Politics of Scandal: The Tower Commission and Iran-Contra," in Kenneth Kitts, *Presidential Commissions and National Security (Boulder: Lynne Rienner, 2006).
 The Great War for Civilisation, The Conquest of the Middle East by Robert Fisk

External links
 Complete text of the Tower Commission Report at the Internet Archive
 
 
 

Nicaraguan Revolution
Iran–Contra affair
United States national commissions